Gaël Genevier (born 26 June 1982) is a French professional footballer who plays as a midfielder for Serie C side AlbinoLeffe.

Career
Genevier moved to Italy in 2003, joining Perugia of Serie A and making four appearances in the Italian top flight before being loaned to Serie B side Catania in January 2004, being rarely featured in the regular lineup and playing only eight times with the etnei. In December 2004 he was consequently released by Perugia and signed by Serie C1 team Acireale, where he finally managed to play regularly. After two seasons with the Sicilian side, he moved to Tuscany to join Sangiovannese, another Serie C1 team, with some success. He was consequently noted by newly promoted Serie B club Pisa, who signed him for the 2007–2008 season.

Siena
On 1 July 2009 Genevier joined A.C. Siena for €400,000 in a 5-year contract. On 29 January 2010 Siena loaned the French defensive midfielder to Serie B club Torino until June. He returned to Siena for 2010–11 Serie B, also due to his injury. After recovery, Genevier played for the reserve of Siena as well as for the first team in friendly match. Genevier only played once competitively, the last round of the league.

In 2011–12 Lega Pro Prima Divisione, Genevier returned to Pisa, now as "AC Pisa 1909 Società sportiva a responsabilità limitata". In 2012–13 Serie B, he was the player of Juve Stabia and Pro Vercelli. On 2 September 2014 Genevier was signed by Novara Calcio.

Lumezzane
On 13 August 2014 Genevier was signed by Lumezzane.

AlbinoLeffe
On 28 January 2019, he signed with AlbinoLeffe.

Honours
Perugia
UEFA Intertoto Cup: 2003

References

External links
Player's blog 

1982 births
Living people
People from Saint-Martin-d'Hères
Association football midfielders
French footballers
Olympique Lyonnais players
A.C. Perugia Calcio players
Catania S.S.D. players
Pisa S.C. players
A.C.N. Siena 1904 players
Torino F.C. players
U.S. Livorno 1915 players
S.S. Juve Stabia players
F.C. Pro Vercelli 1892 players
Novara F.C. players
F.C. Lumezzane V.G.Z. A.S.D. players
A.C. Reggiana 1919 players
A.C.R. Messina players
U.C. AlbinoLeffe players
French expatriate footballers
Serie A players
Serie B players
Serie C players
Serie D players
Expatriate footballers in Italy
Sportspeople from Isère
Footballers from Auvergne-Rhône-Alpes